Frank Grice (13 November 1908 – 1988) was an English professional footballer who played for Linby Colliery, Notts County, Tottenham Hotspur, Glentoran and Dundalk.

Football career 
Grice began his career at Linby Colliery before joining Notts County. The midfielder played 102 matches and scored on four occasions for the Meadow Lane club between 1931–35. In 1935, Grice signed for Tottenham Hotspur where he featured in a further 55 matches and scored once in all competitions. After leaving White Hart Lane he had spells at Glentoran and finally Dundalk.

Management career
Grice held the post of Glentoran manager between 1948–1955.

References

External links
MEHSTG - Where are they now - Frank Grice

1908 births
1988 deaths
Footballers from Derby
English footballers
Association football midfielders
Linby Colliery F.C. players
Notts County F.C. players
Tottenham Hotspur F.C. players
Glentoran F.C. players
Dundalk F.C. players
English Football League players
NIFL Premiership players
League of Ireland players
English football managers
Glentoran F.C. managers
Chelmsford City F.C. managers